Jazvine may refer to:

 Jazvine, Bosnia and Herzegovina, a village near Busovača
 Jazvine, Croatia, a village near Radoboj